Germán Bracco (born 22 August 1998 in Mexico City, Mexico) is a Mexican television actor, and stage actor. Best known for his role Federico Becker in the Televisa's telenovela Caer en tentación (2017–2018), role for which he won the award for Best Young Lead Actor at the 36th TVyNovelas Awards. Although previously had a leading role in the series Yo soy yo (2016–2018), teen drama of the Mexican network Canal Once. Recently he has had important roles in series such as Mi marido tiene más familia (2018–2019), the second season of the Mexican family drama Mi marido tiene familia, and where he played the villain Guido Musi, and La usurpadora as Emilio Bernal, the son of the president of Mexico. On stage he has participated in La sociedad de los poetas muertos (2018–2019), Mexican adaptation of the film Dead Poets Society.

Filmography

Film roles

Television roles

Stage roles

References

External links 
 

Living people
Mexican male film actors
Mexican male stage actors
Mexican male telenovela actors
Mexican male television actors
People from Mexico City
1998 births
Mexican people of Italian descent